The 77th edition of the KNVB Cup (at the time called Amstel Cup) started on June 2, 1994. The final was played on May 25, 1995: Feyenoord beat FC Volendam 2–1 and won the cup for the tenth time. A total of 83 clubs participated.

Teams
 All 18 participants of the Eredivisie 1994-95, four of which entering in the knock-out stage, the rest entering in the group stage
 All 18 participants of the Eerste Divisie 1994-95, entering in the group stage
 Two youth teams, one entering in the group stage, the other entering in the preliminary round
 45 teams from lower (amateur) leagues, six of which entering in the group stage, one of which entering in the intermediary round and the rest entering in the preliminary round

Preliminary round
The matches of the preliminary round were played between June 2 and 8, 1994. Only amateur clubs participated.

Intermediary Round
Three more clubs had to be eliminated before the group stage, so an intermediary round was held. One extra amateur club (FVC) entered the tournament here. The matches were played on June 9, 14 and 15, 1994.

Group stage
The matches of the group stage were played between August 13 and September 13, 1994. Except for four Eredivisie clubs, all other participants entered the tournament here. In total, 56 clubs participated in the group stage, 28 advanced to the next round.

E Eredivisie; 1 Eerste Divisie; A Amateur teams

Knock-out Stage

First round
The matches of the first knock-out round were played on October 5, 1994. The four highest ranked Eredivisie teams from last season entered the tournament this round.

E four Eredivisie entrants

Round of 16
The matches of the round of 16 were played on November 30, 1994.

Quarter finals
The quarter finals were played on February 24, 25 and March 8, 1995.

Semi-finals
The semi-finals were played on March 22, 1995.

Final

Feyenoord would participate in the Cup Winners' Cup.

See also
Eredivisie 1994-95
Eerste Divisie 1994-95

External links
 Results by Ronald Zwiers  

1994-95
1994–95 domestic association football cups
1994–95 in Dutch football